Statistics of Ekstraklasa for the 1993–94 season.

Overview
18 teams competed in the league. The title was won by Legia Warsaw.

League table

Results

Top goalscorers

References

External links
 Poland – List of final tables at RSSSF 

Ekstraklasa seasons
1993–94 in Polish football
Pol